Hexurella encina is a species of spiders native to Mexico. It was first described by Gertsch and Platnick in 1979. It is from the family Hexurellidae.

References

Spiders of Mexico
Mygalomorphae
Spiders described in 1979